Morris Stone is a former American football coach. He served as the head football coach at West Texas A&M University from 1994 to 1996, compiling a record of 15–17.

Stone lettered in five sports at Seymour High School in Seymour, Texas. He played college football as a linebacker at Angelo State University in San Angelo, Texas in 1981 and the University of Oklahoma in 1982 before his playing career ended due to injury. Stone graduated from Midwestern State University in Wichita Falls, Texas in 1986.

Stone was named head coach in April 1994, after serving as interim head coach for about a month. He guided the Buffaloes to a 9–2 season in 1994 and was named Panhandle Sports Hall of Fame Coach of the Year. After West Texas A&M went 5–6 and 1–9, respectively, in 1995 and 1996, Stone resigned.

Head coaching record

College

References

Year of birth missing (living people)
Living people
American football linebackers
Angelo State Rams football players
Midwestern State Mustangs football coaches
Texas Tech Red Raiders football coaches
West Texas A&M Buffaloes football coaches
High school football coaches in Texas
Midwestern State University alumni
People from Baylor County, Texas
Coaches of American football from Texas
Players of American football from Texas